Licapeña is neighborhood in the city of Ibagué, Colombia. It is located 5 kilometers from the marketplace. It is inhabited by about 2000 people, mostly working middle class.

It was originally built in the 17th century, on swampy land.

References 

Populated places in the Tolima Department